Death 'n' roll (portmanteau of death metal and rock 'n' roll) is the subgenre of death metal music that incorporates hard rock-inspired elements to the overall sound. The achieved effect is that of death metal's trademark combination of growled vocals and highly distorted detuned guitar riffing with elements reminiscent of 1970s hard rock and heavy metal. Notable examples include Entombed, Gorefest, Carcass, Six Feet Under, Pungent Stench and the Fernando Colunga Ultimate Experience.

History 

While the "death 'n' roll" tag was first associated with Entombed, Daniel Ekeroth associates the style with a previous group called Furbowl. After Entombed's release, Wolverine Blues, the band became associated with what the music press dubbed as "death 'n' roll", a label which has followed Entombed's career ever since.

Another noteworthy death 'n' roll release is Soul Survivor, Gorefest's 1996 effort. This album showed more than a passing nod to classic rock. Proof of that influence was the club tour organized by the band that same year, where Gorefest played songs by AC/DC, Black Sabbath and Deep Purple. Gorefest broke up after their last 1990s album, Chapter 13, which continued the trend started in Soul Survivor (Gorefest reformed seven years later). Two of its members currently play in Live & Dangerous, a Thin Lizzy tribute band from the Netherlands.

Confronted with the "death 'n' roll" label in interviews, the death metal acts it usually is attached to react with skepticism. Entombed's LG Petrov made the following statement, regarding this issue: "We see it as Entombed music, if people see that as death 'n' roll so be it. We just laugh, death 'n' roll, why not? When we write songs, we aren't thinking it has to be a particular style." When questioned about their mixture of death metal and rock and roll, Gorefest's Frank Harthoorn replied: "Strange, everyone has always mentioned this death n' roll thing. To me it's just metal, plain and simple. I don't believe our influences are different from other bands."

Further reading 
 Ekeroth, Daniel (2008). Swedish Death Metal. Chapter 9: "The Dead Live On ..." Bazillion Points Books. 
 Entombed (1993). Wolverine Blues. [CD]. Nottingham, UK: Earache Records Ltd. Remastered & Limited Edition, 1999.
 Entombed (1997). Entombed. [CD]. New York, NY: Earache Records (U.S.).

References 

20th-century music genres
1990s in music
Death metal
Heavy metal genres